Bazoft-e Bala Rural District is in Bazoft District of Kuhrang County, Chaharmahal and Bakhtiari province, Iran. There were 3,305 inhabitants in 655 households in the National Census of 2011. At the most recent census of 2016, the population of the rural district was 4,144 in 1,000 households. The largest of its 54 villages was Shahrak-e Kushka, with 528 people.

References 

Kuhrang County

Rural Districts of Chaharmahal and Bakhtiari Province

Populated places in Chaharmahal and Bakhtiari Province

Populated places in Kuhrang County

fa:دهستان بازفت بالا